Old Schoolhouse or Old School House may refer to:

in the United Kingdom
Old School House, Cronkbourne, Douglas, Isle of Man, one of Isle of Man's Registered Buildings

in the United States
Old School House (Tampa, Florida), NRHP-listed
Old Schoolhouse (York, Maine), listed on the National Register of Historic Places in York County, Maine
Old Schoolhouse (Mount Holly, New Jersey), listed on the National Register of Historic Places in Burlington County, New Jersey